45th Brigade or 45th Infantry Brigade may refer to:
 45th Guards Spetsnaz Brigade (Russia)
 45th Air Assault Brigade (Ukraine)
 45th Indian Brigade
45th Brigade (United Kingdom)
45th Infantry Brigade Combat Team (United States) 
45th Sustainment Brigade (United States)

See also

 45th Division (disambiguation)
 45th Regiment (disambiguation)
 45th Squadron (disambiguation)